Anna Pieńkosz (born 30 December 1976 in Warsaw) is a Polish civil servant and diplomat, serving as an ambassador to Cuba (2015–2020).

Life 
Pieńkosz has graduated from political science at the University of Silesia in Katowice, as well as romance studies at the Maria Curie-Skłodowska University. She was studying also at the Polish Diplomatic Academy.

In 2002, she joined the Ministry of Foreign Affairs. From 2004 at the Department of the Americas as desk officer for relations with Mercosur. Between 2006 and 2010 she was working at the embassy in Caracas, Venezuela, for a year being in charge of as chargé d’affaires. From 2010 to 2012 she was heading political-economic unit in Havana, Cuba. Since 2012 back at the Department of the Americas, responsible for relations between European Union with Latin America and the Caribbean.

In January 2015 Pieńkosz was nominated Poland ambassador to Cuba. She entered the office on 12 March 2015, and presented her credentials within two weeks. She ended her term on 15 November 2020.

Besides Polish, Pieńkosz speaks English and Spanish, and French languages.

References 

1976 births
Ambassadors of Poland to Cuba
Living people
Diplomats from Warsaw
Maria Curie-Skłodowska University alumni
Polish women ambassadors
University of Silesia in Katowice alumni